Lost Girl is a Canadian supernatural drama television series  that premiered on Showcase on September 12, 2010. The series was created by Michelle Lovretta and is produced by Jay Firestone, Prodigy Pictures Inc.,  and Keyframe Digital Productions, Inc.,  with the participation of the Canadian Television Fund (Canada Media Fund), and in association with Shaw Media. It follows the life of a bisexual succubus named Bo, played by Anna Silk, as she learns to control her superhuman abilities, help those in need, and discover the truth about her origins.

Lost Girl premiered on Showcase on September 12, 2010. Its debut became "the highest-rated Canadian scripted series premiere of all time on Showcase."

The series premiered in Australia on Sci Fi on July 14, 2011.  In the United Kingdom and Ireland, the series premiered on Syfy (UK) on September 1, 2011.  In the United States, the series premiered on Syfy on January 16, 2012.

Plot

Bo is a Succubus who grew up in an adopted human family, unaware of her non-human nature and of the Fae world she descended from. She began to feel "different" when she entered puberty and didn't know she was not normal until she accidentally killed her high school boyfriend by draining his life energy during her first sexual encounter. When she told her parents what had happened, they broke the news to Bo that she had been adopted (see "Raging Fae"). Not knowing what she was and what she had done, Bo hated herself and ran away from home, exchanging her previous life for one without family or friends, moving from place to place and assuming a false identity whenever she killed again.

In the first episode, Bo saves a young human woman, Kenzi, from a rapist who had surreptitiously drugged her with a "roofie" in her drink. The two quickly become friends and Kenzi decides they should team up to create a Fae/Human detective agency. Confronted by the Fae leaders of the local territory with a demand for her to choose a side – either "Light" or "Dark" – Bo declares herself neutral, deciding instead to side with humans after Kenzi risked her life to find out where Bo had been taken by force and what they were doing to her. Most of the Fae considered Bo an unknown entity that should either be eliminated as a risk to their secret existence or exploited for their benefit. Throughout the season, Bo learns more about the Fae world and herself while she searches for information about her origins. Along the way, Bo also develops romantic relationships with both Dyson, a Light Fae wolf shapeshifter and police detective; and Lauren, a human doctor and scientist in servitude to the Light Fae.

Episodes

Cast and characters

Main cast
 Anna Silk  as Bo
 Kris Holden-Ried  as Dyson
 Ksenia Solo  as Kenzi
 Zoie Palmer  as Dr. Lauren Lewis
 Rick Howland  as Fitzpatrick "Trick" McCorrigan
 K. C. Collins  as Hale Santiago

Recurring cast
 Clé Bennett as The Ash
 Inga Cadranel as Saskia / Aife
 Emmanuelle Vaugier as Evony Fleurette Marquise / The Morrigan.
 Paul Amos as Vex
 Aron Tager as Mayer

Production
On November 16, 2008, Prodigy Pictures issued a press release that they had been commissioned by Canwest (Canwest Global Communications Corp.) to produce a pilot for Lost Girl, a drama about a young woman with supernatural powers.  On August 13, 2009, Canwest announced that the Showcase television channel, a subsidiary of the main company, had given the green-light for a 13-episode, one-hour supernatural drama series named Lost Girl.  On April 6, 2010, Prodigy Pictures reported that "principal photography is underway for 13 one-hour episodes of the new original Canadian fantasy-noir series, Lost Girl."
Filming will take place at a West Toronto soundstage and on location in the vicinities of Toronto and Hamilton until June 25, 2010. The series is set to air on Showcase in the fall. Lost Girl follows supernatural seductress Bo (Anna Silk), a Succubus who feeds on the sexual energy of mortals. Bo’s succubus nature tangles her in a sexy, romantic love-triangle with Dyson (Kris Holden-Reid), a shape-shifting Fae and homicide detective, and Lauren (Zoie Palmer), a human doctor who has found a way through science to help give Bo the sexual self-control she's been aching for. Navigating this complicated life with Bo is her human confidante and street-smart survivor, Kenzi (Ksenia Solo). Writers include Michelle Lovretta; Peter Mohan; Jeremy Boxen; Emily Andras; and Pamela Pinch. A companion website for the series is being produced concurrently and will launch with the show to give viewers an unprecedented, interactive experience." The series was aimed for a September 2010 release date.

On June 22, 2010, Keyframe Digital Productions Inc. reported that they had been given the contract for visual effects on the first thirteen episodes of Lost Girl.

As part of the promotion of the series, an official site was opened at the beginning of August 2010 at www.lostgirlseries.com. It contained a short trailer for the series and a summary of information on the show and its characters. On August 20, 2010, "Lost Girl: The Interactive Motion Comic" was released as a lead-in to the series. On the same date, a press release indicated that Lost Girl cast and crew would be making an appearance at Fan Expo Canada in Toronto on August 27–29, 2010, where they would be answering questions about the show and have promotional items available for audience members as well.

Lost Girl premiered on Showcase on September 12, 2010. The show's debut became "the highest-rated Canadian scripted series premiere of all time on Showcase."

The first season episode "Vexed" (1.08) is the original pilot shown to Showcase to obtain the green-light for the series.

On May 18, 2011, Syfy (U.S.) announced that it had acquired 26 episodes (Season One and Season Two) of Lost Girl from Prodigy Pictures.

The United States debut of Lost Girl on January 16, 2012, was announced by Syfy on December 12, 2011.  Episodes broadcast by Syfy in the United States are edited from their original 44:00 minutes to allow more time for commercial advertisements.

Home media release
In Canada, Entertainment One, Ltd. released the DVD of Season One on April 24, 2012. In Australia (Region 4), Sony Pictures Home Entertainment released Season 1 on DVD on November 23, 2011; In the United States (Region 1), Giant Ape Media (Funimation SC) released the Season 1 uncut episodes "not seen on Syfy" on DVD and Blu-ray on October 23, 2012. In the United Kingdom and Ireland (Region 2), Sony Pictures Home Entertainment released Season 1 on DVD on February 25, 2013.

Reception

Ratings
Ratings for the 9 p.m. series premiere on September 12, 2010, was over "400,000 viewers (2+)" and "another 184,000 (2+)" for the episode rerun at 10:40 p.m., making Lost Girl the "highest-rated Canadian scripted series premiere of all time on Showcase."

Critical response and popularity
The review aggregator website Rotten Tomatoes reported a 75% approval rating with an average rating of 7.4 out of 10 based on 12 reviews. The consensus reads: "Strong storytelling and intriguing characters help make Lost Girl a better-than-average supernatural/sci-fi series, even if the special effects leave something to be desired." On Metacritic, the season scored 68 out of 100, based on 11 critics, indicating "generally favorable reviews".

In Canada, Rob Salem of the Toronto Star described the show as one that "definitely bears watching".
Vladislav Tinchev, writer for the German site Serienjunkies wrote that the series would benefit from "revealing more background information about the represented world," rather than spend time on "clumsy action scenes".  But Tinchev pointed out that "Lost Girl is not lost at all, and has immediately won the audience and entertains them well. And there is nothing wrong with that, because TV series need not be world-shaking events."

In anticipation of its United States premiere, Brian Lowry of Variety wrote: "At first glance, Lost Girl looks like another one of those Canadian imports picked up mostly for financial reasons. The pilot, however, proves unexpectedly fun—a sort of diluted version of True Blood... but the show has wit, style and an enticing lead in the leather-clad Anna Silk." Writing for The New York Times, Mike Hale said: "Like other fantasy-tinged shows on Syfy and USA, it offers the minor pleasures of formulaic fantasy and weekly puzzle solving, though in a cheaper-looking and less original package than usual...." In a post-premiere review for The Huffington Post, Mauren Ryan wrote: "No one can say there's been a dearth of genre-tinged programs on television in recent years. The vampire boom of the mid-aughts was followed by the zombie bonanza of the last couple of years; all in all, we're awash in various undead and otherworldly creatures...But one of the reasons Lost Girl has made such a big impression on me...is because the Syfy show does what so many genre programs fail to do these days: It has fun with its premise...But don't expect Lost Girl to be perfect: Bo's universe can seem constricted at times, the weekly clients and monsters aren't always interesting and occasionally the storytelling has abrupt moments. But my occasional complaints have been overwhelmed by my growing appreciation of what creator Michelle Lovretta has done with this light drama: She's created a Hero's Journey with a self-confident woman — a succubus, no less — at the center of it...Lovretta has done something subversively impressive with Lost Girl. She's built a whole show around the idea of a woman who is learning just how much she can or should take from others, and how much she can rely on herself."

The relationship between Bo and Lauren became popularly referred to as "Doccubus" after fans of the couple combined "Doctor" Lauren Lewis with Bo's  "Succubus" species (i.e. Doc+cubus) to create the alias. The term became widely used by entertainment media and bloggers when referring to the pairing.

In a 2012 report by TiVo of television programs watched at bedtime, Lost Girl was rated one of the top ten, most watched shows.

In a Slate magazine 2012 year-end list of 15 favorite television shows that are a pleasure to watch, Lost Girl (on Syfy) was named "Number 1" on the list, and hailed as "Sexy, snarky, and Canadian."

Accolades

References

External links
 
 Lost Girl at  Syfy (U.S.) 
  Lost Girl at Prodigy Pictures Inc.  
 Lost Girl at Canadian Television Fund  
 
 
 Lost Girl list of episodes at Garn's Guides
 Lost Girl at BO SERIES INC. (Giant Ape Media)

Season
2010 Canadian television seasons